Judo Bank is an Australian bank focused on small and medium-sized enterprise lending but also offers a range of personal term deposit products to consumers.

History
Judo was founded with an initial seed investment from an Australian consortium of family offices, led by businessman Geoff Lord.

Followed by Australia's largest raising of capital for 2018, Judo Capital launched in March 2018, raising more than $140 million from Australian and international investors, coordinated by Ironbridge Capital.

Former National Australia Bank executives – including co-founders Joseph Healy, David Hornery, Tim Alexander, Chris Bayliss and Jacqui Colwell – serve on the board.

Ironbridge Capital, Canadian pension fund manager OPTrust, Myer Family Investments, Abu Dhabi Capital Group, Zhong Yi Investment and Credit Suisse Asset Management, Cambooya, Inception Asset Management, Esson and CH Warman Group own shares in Judo Capital.

Former Australian Treasury Secretary John Fraser joined the board of Judo Capital, alongside former Federal Small Business Minister Bruce Billson.

In November 2018, Credit Suisse increased their interest in Judo with a $350 million debt facility. followed by a $100 million facility from Goldman Sachs in April 2019.

In April 2019, The Australian Prudential Regulation Authority announced it had granted Judo Bank Pty Ltd a licence to operate as an authorised deposit-taking institution (ADI) without restriction following its application in May 2018. As part of the license grant, the business changed its name from Judo Capital to Judo Bank.

In June 2019, Judo Bank closed series B round with $345 million in firm commitments and an unnamed institution granted an extension of a few weeks to complete due diligence, with total expected to exceed $400m.

In August 2019, After the latest $400m raising, new investors now include the €23bn Paris and London fund Tikehau Capital, and the $US105bn Boston-based alternative investment firm Bain Capital.

In September 2019, Judo Bank entered the retail deposits, and was named as the best Aussie startup to work for, according to LinkedIn's second annual top startups list.

In November 2019, KPMG and H2 Ventures Global Fintech 100 list ranked Judo Bank at No. 33.

In January 2020, Judo Bank lent $1B to Australian businesses raising, and another $1B in digital retail term deposits.

In February 2020, Judo Bank was announced the winner of the Mozo Experts choice awards 2020 Term Deposits. "Mozo Experts Choice Awards showcase providers who outperformed their competitors in delivering a great product to customers," said Mozo's Kirsty Lamont, "Judo scooped one of the top awards after being compared with 68 term deposit accounts, offering some of the best interest rates across short, medium and long term investments, which is no small feat."

In March 2020, Judo Bank signed a further three-year, $350 million committed debt facility with Citi Bank bringing the total to $1billion on top of the $1.3 billion in government-guaranteed customer deposits. "As in the global financial crisis, deposits are flowing to the banking sector, including us" said David Hornery Co CEO.

On Thursday, 2 April 2020, The Australian government announced that it would invest an initial $250 million into Judo Bank's lending warehouse through the Australian Office of Financial Management's (AOFM) Australian Business Securitisation Fund and a further $250 million through its recently announced Structured Finance Support Fund (SFSF). The investment from the AOFM makes Judo Bank the first recipient of capital from the government's $2 billion small and medium enterprise funding scheme that was unveiled in November 2018.

In May 2020, Judo Bank had raised $230 million in fresh equity at a post-money valuation of over $1 billion, from existing investors, lifting it into an exclusive club of startup companies, and showing the support of existing investors despite the risks COVID-19 presented to business banking. "The support we’ve received for our third round, at an increased valuation to our second round capital raise last year, underscores the confidence and commitment our existing investors have in Judo, particularly at a time of extreme volatility in global markets, that has impacted all bank valuations," Mr Hornery said in a statement.

Having joined the Unicorn Club in May 2020 with a valuation of $1.6 billion, Judo Bank was the first of the Aussie challenger banks to reach this coveted position.

In July 2020, Judo Bank won the Bank of the Year – Term Deposits Award. Canstar Research noted Judo Bank was the market leader among banks when it came to interest rates, and beat the market average on features, with a market-leading performance on options offered at term deposit maturity.

In September 2020, Judo Bank was crowned the winner of the Finder Awards Term Deposit for our 12-month term deposit.

In September 2020, KPMG's Pulse of Fintech report showed that venture capital investment in Australia's fintech sector had charged ahead, up 153% year on year, and that one of the two largest fintech transactions regarded Judo Bank with $203.4m.

In September 2020, According to LinkedIn's 3rd Annual Top Startups, Judo Bank was named as best and most resilient Aussie Startup to work for.

In December 2020, Judo Bank was ranked among the top 10 independent neo-banks across the globe by WhiteSight's Top 20 neo-banks of 2020 research, which based the ranking of the neo-banks on valuation. Judo Bank was the only Australian bank to rank among the top 10 neo-banks.

Operations
Judo follows the SME challenger bank model developed by Aldermore, Shawbrook Bank and OakNorth Bank in the UK.

Political commentary
Small Business & Family Enterprise Ombudsman Kate Carnell says Judo Bank's launch is well-timed with the lending shortfall continuing to grow. "There is no competition", Carnell said. "The big four banks have 80 percent plus of the SME lending market and they mostly don't lend except if it is secured against property and that means access to capital is very difficult for many SMEs."

Australian Prime Minister, Scott Morrison gave a virtual speech at the Singapore FinTech Festival on 8 December 2020, speaking about fintechs' positive impact on the economic recovery, referring to Judo and four Australian fintechs in particular. "I am incredibly proud of what our Aussie start-ups and early age ventures are achieving, as well as our well-established unicorns and what they’re achieving. You know some of them: Atlassian, Airwallex, Afterpay, Judo Bank, Athena Home Loans."

References

External links 

 

Banks of Australia
Companies based in Melbourne
Australian companies established in 2016
Banks established in 2016
Neobanks